Changing the Game is the only studio album by Rashawnna "Shawnna" Guy and Lateefa "Teefa" Harland together known as Infamous Syndicate. It was released on March 16, 1999, via Relativity Records. Production was handled by No I.D., Kanye West, Andy C., Echo, Mr. Khaliyl, and Shawnna's brother Michael Antonio "Icedrake" Guy. It features guest appearances from Big Nastee, Cap.One, Fatal, Franklin Williams Jr., Kanye West and Kia Jeffries. The album peaked at number 50 on the US Billboard Top R&B/Hip-Hop Albums and at number 18 on the Heatseekers Albums. Its lead single, "Here I Go", was also featured on The PJs: Music from & Inspired by the Hit Television Series.

Track listing

Notes
  signifies a co-producer

Charts

References

External links

Shawnna albums
1999 debut albums
Infamous Syndicate albums
Relativity Records albums
Albums produced by No I.D.
Albums produced by Kanye West